John Bowyer (fl. 1404), of Wells, Somerset, was an English politician.

He was a Member (MP) of the Parliament of England for Wells in October 1404.

References

14th-century births
15th-century deaths
Politicians from Somerset
English MPs October 1404